TV Jaagriti is a Trinidadian and Tobagonian Hindu religious television channel, that is operated by the Central Broadcasting Services Limited, which is owned by the Sanatan Dharma Maha Sabha, a major Hindu organization in Trinidad and Tobago. It airs programming related to the Indian Hindus in Trinidad and Tobago such as religious, cultural, news, lifestyle, health, youth and political programs.

See also 
 Hinduism in Trinidad and Tobago
 Sanatan Dharma Maha Sabha

References

Hindu television
Hinduism in Trinidad and Tobago
Television stations in Trinidad and Tobago
Religious television stations
Television channels and stations established in 2015